The International Pepper Exchange is an organisation headquartered in Kochi, India, that deals with the global trade of black pepper. The exchange, established in 1997, has been described as the world's only international pepper exchange.

See also
International Pepper Community

References

Pepper trade
Companies based in Kochi
Commodity exchanges in India
1997 establishments in Kerala
Commodity markets in Kerala
Indian companies established in 2007